Khidi-Khutor (Ẋidi-Khotar) is a rural locality (a selo) in Kurchaloyevsky District, Chechnya.

Administrative and municipal status 
Municipally, Khidi-Khutor is incorporated as Khidi-Khutorskoye rural settlement. It is the administrative center of the municipality and one of two settlements included in it.

Geography 

Khidi-Khutor is located on the right bank of the Gums River.

The nearest settlements to Khidi-Khutor are Mayrtup in the north, Dzhigurty and Akhkinchu-Borzoy in the north-east, Belty and Yalkhoy-Mokhk in the east, Koren-Benoy and Achereshki in the south, Regita in the south-west, Dzhaglargi in the west, and Avtury in the north-west.

Name 
The name of the village translates roughly as "Hidi's farm" - with "Hidi" being the name of the founder.

History 
In 1944, after the genocide and deportation of the Chechen and Ingush people and the Chechen-Ingush ASSR was abolished, the village of Khidi-Khutor was renamed to Gunzi, and settled by people from the neighbouring republic of Dagestan.

In 1957, when the Vaynakh people returned and the Chechen-Ingush ASSR was restored, the village regained its old Chechen name, Khidi-Khutor.

Population 
 1990 Census: 819
 2002 Census: 600
 2010 Census: 1,093
 2019 estimate: ?

According to the results of the 2010 Census, the majority of residents of Khidi-Khutor were ethnic Chechens.

Famous Natives 
Said Shaipov, a Chechen artist, was born in Khidi-Khutor.

References 

Rural localities in Kurchaloyevsky District